In arithmetic geometry, the Weil–Châtelet group or WC-group of an algebraic group such as an abelian variety A defined over a field K is the abelian group of principal homogeneous spaces for A, defined over K.  named it for  who introduced it for elliptic curves, and , who introduced it for more  general groups. It plays a basic role in the arithmetic of abelian varieties, in particular for elliptic curves, because of its connection with infinite descent.

For K a finite field,  proved that the Weil–Châtelet group is trivial for elliptic curves, and  proved that it is trivial for any connected algebraic group.

See also

The Tate–Shafarevich group of an abelian variety A defined over a number field K consists of the elements of the Weil–Châtelet group that become trivial in all of the completions of K.

The Selmer group, named after Ernst S. Selmer, of A with respect to an isogeny  of abelian varieties is a related group which can be defined in terms of Galois cohomology as

 .

References 

 
 
 
 
 
 
   English translation in his collected mathematical papers.
 
 

Number theory